Miss Jamaica World is a national beauty pageant in Jamaica that selects a contestant to represent the country in the Miss World beauty pageant.

History
The Miss Jamaica pageant's predecessor, the "Miss Jamaica Contest", dates back to the 1930s. The winner of Miss Jamaica represents Jamaica at the Miss World pageant from 1978–present. The title of Miss Jamaica World was officially coined in 1978. The 1976 and 1977 representatives were appointed by then licence holder Mickey Haughton-James of Spartan Health Club. Spartan held the franchise from 1976 to 2012. And resumed its leadership in 2017.

In 2018, Miss World Organization announced that the franchise to stage the Miss Jamaica World pageant as a precursor to Miss World has been granted to Crown of Beauty Jamaica Limited whose principals are local playwright and impresario Aston Cooke and veteran entertainment specialist Weston Haughton.

Jamaica sent its first representative to Miss World in 1959. To date Jamaica has now won four Miss World titles (1963, 1976, 1993, and 2019).

Titleholders
Color key

The winner of Miss Jamaica World represents her country at Miss World. On occasion, when the winner does not qualify (due to age) for either contest, a runner-up is sent.

Trivia
Miss Jamaica 1963 is the shortest woman in history to win Miss World.

Cindy Breakspeare is the mother of Damian Marley, son of reggae icon Bob Marley.

Joan McDonald was the first to hold the official title of Miss Jamaica WORLD. She is also the first winner of full African descent. Her win came at a time when public pressure built up for winners who represented the dominant ethic group in Jamaica.

Lisa Hanna is currently a Member of Parliament and former Minister of Youth and Culture.

Miss Jamaica World 1991, Sandra Foster, represented Jamaica at Miss Universe 1989 and made Top Ten.

Miss Jamaica World 1989, Janice Sewell, is currently working as Human Resources.

Miss Jamaica World 1995, Imani Duncan, currently serves as a Senator.

Regina Beavers became the youngest title holder, she won at age 17 in 2001.

Miss Jamaica World 1998, Christine Straw, later represented Jamaica in Miss Universe 2004, making the Top Ten.

Miss Jamaica World 2005, Terri-Karelle Griffith-Reid, is a successful keynote speaker, events and TV host. She is the host of the popular talent show Digicel Rising Stars, which was previously hosted by Yendi Phillipps from 2008 to 2009.

Miss Jamaica World 2006 was subject to controversy when she got pregnant during her reign. Miss World CEO Julia Morley allowed her to retain her title as Miss World Caribbean.

Miss Jamaica World 2007, Yendi Phillipps, went on to win Miss Jamaica Universe in 2010 and placed first runner-up at Miss Universe 2010.

Miss Jamaica World 2009, Kerrie Baylis later represented Jamaica at Miss Universe 2013 but was unplaced.

Miss Jamaica World 2017 and Miss World Caribbean 2017 Solange Sinclair is the granddaughter of deceased Hollywood actress Madge Sinclair who had notable roles as Queen Aoleon in Coming to America and voice of Sarabi in Disney's The Lion King

References

External links

 
 Miss World Official Website
 Marguerite Carby, "Ms Jamaica Pageant - History", My-Island-Jamaica.com

Jamaica
Recurring events established in 1959
Jamaica
Jamaican awards